Rätzlingen may refer to the following places in Germany:

 Rätzlingen, Lower Saxony
 Rätzlingen, Saxony-Anhalt